Roger Webb (7 April 1934 – 19 December 2002) was a British songwriter and jazz pianist best known for leading Roger Webb's Trio (1963-1965) for television series and club performances, and Roger Webb's Orchestra. The Roger Webb Trio appeared regularly (1963-1965) at Harrison and Gibson's Trojan Room restaurant in Bromley, Kent. A Spanish waiter, Manuel Linares Alvaro, was often invited by Roger to sing with the trio.

His songs were sung by Bette Davis, Rex Harrison, Johnny Mathis, Shirley Bassey, Danny Williams and others.

His film work included music for movies such as One Brief Summer (1970), Bartleby (1970), Burke & Hare (1971), Au Pair Girls (1972), Bedtime with Rosie (1974), The Amorous Milkman (1975), Intimate Games (1976), What's Up Nurse! (1977), The Godsend (1980), Death of a Centerfold: The Dorothy Stratten Story (1981), The Boy in Blue (1986), He's My Girl (1987), and Riders (1993). His TV work includes the opening themes of Strange Report, Hammer House of Horror, The Gentle Touch and Paradise Postponed, and the opening theme used from series 2 onwards of George and Mildred. With Geoff Love he provided orchestral arrangements for The Last Will and Testament of Jake Thackray. He also worked with Dee Shipman on the musical Emma.

Discography
"A-side", 1965 single produced by Mickie Most

References

External links
 
 
 

1934 births
2002 deaths